The 1918 Oglethorpe Stormy Petrels football team represented Oglethorpe University in American football during the 1918 college football season. The addition of a Student's Army Training Corps detachment at Oglethorpe increased enrolment significantly. This allowed Oglethorpe to field a larger team of consistently 30 boys. Oglethorpe's first large game against another college that was widely viewed by the public was played against The University of Tennessee at Chattanooga, although Oglethorpe did play Auburn University earlier that season. Despite being beaten, the Oglethorpe squad held Auburn for 8 consecutive downs in the last few minutes of the game. Oglethorpe's rematch against the  Non-Coms. of Camp Gordon was much closer than the defeat earlier in the season, which Oglethorpe claims to have lost due to the unfairness of the officials. Oglethorpe won the game with a safety in the last few minutes.

Schedule

References

Oglethorpe
Oglethorpe Stormy Petrels football seasons
Oglethorpe Stormy Petrels football